Ficus muelleriana is a species of plant in the family Moraceae. It is endemic to Mozambique.  It is threatened by habitat loss.

References

Sources

Flora of Mozambique
muelleriana
Endangered plants
Endemic flora of Mozambique
Taxonomy articles created by Polbot